The 1909–10 team finished with a record of 9–2. It was the 1st year for head coach Clare Hunt. The team captain was Howard McAllister. W.P. Bowen was the trainer.

Roster

Schedule

|-
!colspan=9 style="background:#006633; color:#FFFFFF;"| Non-conference regular season

1. Media guide list score as 30-24 and yearbook list score as 38-42.

2. EMU list the score as 38–23 and Detroit Mercy list the score as 39–24.

3. EMU list the score as 32–21. EMU yearbook and CMU list the score as 33–21.

References

Eastern Michigan Eagles men's basketball seasons
Michigan State Normal